is a railway station on the Keisei Main Line in Katsushika, Tokyo, Japan, operated by the private railway operator Keisei Electric Railway.

Lines
Ohanajaya Station is served by the Keisei Main Line.

Layout

The station consists of two side platforms serving two tracks.

Platforms

History
Ohanajaya Station opened on 19 December 1931.

Station numbering was introduced to all Keisei Line stations on 17 June 2010. Ohanajaya was assigned station number KS08.

See also
 List of railway stations in Japan

References

External links

 Keisei station information 

Railway stations in Tokyo
Keisei Main Line
Railway stations in Japan opened in 1931